Welsh Braille is the braille alphabet of the Welsh language. It uses one of the Grade- shortcuts of English Braille,  ch, but otherwise print digraphs in the Welsh alphabet are digraphs in braille as well: 
 dd,  ff,  ng,  ll,  ph,  rh,  th.

Accents are rendered with circumflex , diaeresis , grave , acute .

Welsh Braille also has a number of contractions.  Punctuation is as in English Braille.

References

French-ordered braille alphabets
Braille